Battleship Massachusetts can refer to:

 USS Massachusetts (BB-2) (1896-1919), now an underwater preserve
 USS Massachusetts (BB-59), a World War II battleship now a museum ship.

See also
 USS Massachusetts